The 2020 Money in the Bank was the 11th annual Money in the Bank professional wrestling pay-per-view and livestreaming event produced by WWE. It was held for wrestlers from the promotion's Raw and SmackDown brand divisions. The event aired on May 10, 2020. While the majority of the event aired live from the WWE Performance Center in Orlando, Florida, the show's eponymous ladder matches were pre-recorded on April 15 at WWE's Titan Towers global headquarters building in Stamford, Connecticut. 

The event was originally scheduled to take place at the Royal Farms Arena in Baltimore, Maryland, but the venue cancelled all shows that were to be held due to the COVID-19 pandemic. In response, WWE took advantage of the situation and moved the two titular ladder matches to their global headquarters building in Stamford with a new "Corporate Ladder" gimmick where the match's titular briefcases were suspended above a ring on the building's roof. The wrestlers began on the ground floor and fought their way to the roof. The eponymous matches were produced as cinematic matches.
 
Eight matches were contested at the event, including one on the Kickoff pre-show. In the main event, Otis and Asuka won their respective Money in the Bank ladder matches, which were contested at the same time. In the penultimate match, Drew McIntyre defeated Seth Rollins to retain Raw's WWE Championship. Other prominent matches included Braun Strowman defeating Bray Wyatt to retain SmackDown's Universal Championship, and Bayley defeating Tamina to retain the SmackDown Women's Championship.

Production

Background
Money in the Bank is an annual gimmick pay-per-view (PPV) and WWE Network event produced by WWE since 2010, generally held between May and July. The concept of the show comes from WWE's established Money in the Bank ladder match, in which multiple wrestlers use ladders to retrieve a briefcase hanging above the ring. The briefcase contains a contract that guarantees the winner a match for a world championship of their choosing at any time within the next year. The 2020 event featured wrestlers from the Raw and SmackDown brands; male wrestlers competed for a contract to grant them a match for either Raw's WWE Championship or SmackDown's Universal Championship, while female wrestlers competed for a Raw Women's Championship or SmackDown Women's Championship match contract—though the day after the event, it was revealed that the women's match was actually for the Raw Women's Championship instead of a title match contract due to the unexpected circumstances that forced the then-Raw Women's Champion to go on hiatus. The 2020 show was the 11th event in the Money in the Bank chronology.

Impact of the COVID-19 pandemic

As with WWE's other programming since March 13, 2020, the COVID-19 pandemic necessitated changes to the PPV; Money in the Bank was originally announced to be held on May 10, 2020, at the Royal Farms Arena in Baltimore, Maryland. However, on March 30, one week before WrestleMania 36, Maryland Governor Larry Hogan issued a stay at home order. An advertisement promoting Money in the Bank for May 10 aired during WrestleMania 36 Part 2 on April 5, but with no reference to a city or venue. Subsequently, Royal Farms Arena cancelled all events due to the pandemic and began issuing refunds. 

WWE initially did not announce whether the event would still go on from a different location (such as the WWE Performance Center in Orlando, Florida where most WWE shows for Raw and SmackDown had been held since March 13), but on the April 17 episode of SmackDown, it was announced that the two Money in the Bank ladder matches would take place at WWE's global headquarters in Stamford, Connecticut. A new "Corporate Ladder" gimmick was also added to the matches, in which the participants had to travel from the ground floor of the building to the roof in order to locate the briefcases, which were suspended above a ring on the roof. It was also announced that the men's and women's matches would take place at the same time. With the changes in format, the number of participants in each match was also reduced to six; since the 2018 event, both the men's and women's ladder matches featured eight wrestlers that were evenly divided between the Raw and SmackDown brands. While the ladder matches were pre-recorded on April 15 as cinematic matches, it was confirmed on the day of the event that all of the other matches would take place live from the WWE Performance Center with no fans in attendance.

Storylines
The show comprised eight matches, including one on the Kickoff pre-show. The matches resulted from scripted storylines, where wrestlers portrayed heroes, villains, or less distinguishable characters in scripted events that built tension and culminated in a wrestling match or series of matches. Results were predetermined by WWE's writers on the Raw and SmackDown brands, while storylines were produced on WWE's weekly television shows, Monday Night Raw and Friday Night SmackDown. 

At Super ShowDown, "The Fiend" Bray Wyatt lost the Universal Championship to Goldberg, who in turn lost the title to Braun Strowman during WrestleMania 36 Part 1. On the following episode of SmackDown, Wyatt interrupted Strowman after his match and reminded Strowman that it was he who brought him to the WWE with his old Wyatt Family stable. He then stated he wanted his title back and Strowman accepted the challenge, which was scheduled for Money in the Bank, though against Wyatt's normal self instead of The Fiend.

Qualifying matches for the women's Money in the Bank ladder match began on the April 13 episode of Raw. Asuka, Shayna Baszler, and the returning Nia Jax qualified for the match by defeating Ruby Riott, Sarah Logan, and Kairi Sane, respectively. Dana Brooke then qualified by defeating Naomi on the April 17 episode of SmackDown. On the following week's SmackDown, Lacey Evans defeated Sasha Banks to qualify for the match. Carmella won the final spot by defeating Mandy Rose on the May 1 episode of SmackDown.

Qualifying matches for the men's Money in the Bank ladder match began on the April 17 episode of SmackDown where Daniel Bryan defeated Cesaro to qualify. On the following Raw, Aleister Black, Apollo Crews, and Rey Mysterio qualified for the match by defeating Austin Theory, Montel Vontavious Porter (MVP), and Murphy, respectively. King Corbin then qualified by defeating Drew Gulak on the April 24 episode of SmackDown. On the April 27 episode of Raw, Crews injured his left knee during his United States Championship match against Andrade, pulling him from the ladder match. Otis was the next to qualify by defeating Dolph Ziggler on the May 1 episode of SmackDown. On the May 4 episode of Raw, AJ Styles—in his first appearance since being buried alive by The Undertaker at WrestleMania—won a Last Chance gauntlet match to take the final spot vacated by Crews. 

During WrestleMania 36 Part 2, Tamina was eliminated first in the fatal five-way elimination match for the SmackDown Women's Championship due to all of the other competitors piling on top of her for the pin; Bayley subsequently retained the title. On the following SmackDown, Tamina pointed out the fact that Bayley nor any other competitor in that match actually beat her and challenged Bayley to a singles match for the championship. Bayley agreed if Tamina could defeat her friend Sasha Banks, which she did the following week to earn the title match at Money in the Bank. 

During WrestleMania 36 Part 1, Seth Rollins lost to Kevin Owens, while in the main event of Part 2, Drew McIntyre defeated Brock Lesnar to win the WWE Championship. On the April 13 episode of Raw, Rollins stated that by losing to Owens, he had been crucified and now had truly risen (buying into his "Monday Night Messiah" gimmick). He later attacked McIntyre following the latter's match and performed two Stomps on him. The following week, McIntyre challenged Rollins to a match at Money in the Bank with his title on the line, stating that as champion, he needed to face the best. Rollins responded, noting their similarities, such as both being former NXT Champions, as well as both defeating Lesnar to win a world championship at WrestleMania (which Rollins did twice, first at WrestleMania 31 for the WWE Championship—at that time called the WWE World Heavyweight Championship—and again at WrestleMania 35 for the Universal Championship). Rollins then accepted McIntyre's challenge. 

On the April 17 episode of SmackDown, The New Day's Big E defeated Jey Uso (representing The Usos) and defending co-champion The Miz (representing himself and John Morrison) in a triple threat match to win the SmackDown Tag Team Championship for The New Day. The following week, Lucha House Party (Lince Dorado and Gran Metalik) came out to challenge New Day but were interrupted by Miz and John Morrison, who also challenged The New Day. The Forgotten Sons (Steve Cutler, Jaxson Ryker, and Wesley Blake) then made their SmackDown debut, stating they would be taking over the brand's tag team division before attacking New Day. The following week, The Forgotten Sons (Cutler and Blake) defeated The New Day (Big E and Kofi Kingston) in a non-title match where Miz and Morrison were on commentary. The New Day were then scheduled to defend the SmackDown Tag Team Championship against The Forgotten Sons, Miz and Morrison, and Lucha House Party in a fatal four-way tag team match at Money in the Bank.

Event

Pre-show
During the Money in the Bank Kickoff pre-show, Jeff Hardy faced Cesaro. In the end, Hardy performed a Swanton Bomb on Cesaro to win the match.

Preliminarily matches
The actual pay-per-view opened with The New Day (Big E and Kofi Kingston) defending the SmackDown Tag Team Championship against The Miz and John Morrison, Lucha House Party (Lince Dorado and Gran Metalik), and The Forgotten Sons (Steve Cutler and Wesley Blake) (accompanied by Jaxson Ryker). During the match, Ryker was ejected from ringside for interference. In the climax, Big E performed the Big Ending on Metalik to retain the title.

Next, R-Truth was scheduled to face MVP. Truth began to insult MVP, who was offended. Bobby Lashley then interrupted and decided that he would be the one to face Truth and MVP agreed. In the end, Lashley performed a Spear on Truth to win the match.

After that, Bayley (accompanied by Sasha Banks) defended the SmackDown Women's Championship against Tamina. During the first half of the match, Bayley began to target Tamina's leg. After Bayley taunted Tamina by splashing water on her, Tamina performed a clothesline on Bayley and threw her onto the announce table. After Tamina performed a Samoan Drop on Bayley, Banks distracted Tamina. This allowed Bayley to recover and attack Tamina. As Tamina attempted a Samoan Drop, Bayley countered into a roll-up to retain the title. Following the match, as Tamina attempted a Samoan Drop for a third time on Bayley, Banks attacked Tamina and saved Bayley once again. 

In the next match, Braun Strowman defended the Universal Championship against Bray Wyatt. During the match, Strowman dominated Wyatt. As Strowman attempted to tackle Wyatt outside the ring, Wyatt avoided Strowman, who collided with the announce table. Huskus The Pig Boy puppet then appeared behind the barricade to cheer on Wyatt while he was dominating Strowman. Wyatt performed a Sister Abigail on Strowman for a near-fall. As Wyatt attempted another Sister Abigail, Strowman countered into a Chokeslam. Strowman then performed a Running Powerslam on Wyatt outside the ring. In the closing moments, Strowman wore his old "Black Sheep" mask, with which Wyatt had taunted him on episodes of SmackDown and was an integral part of Strowman's gimmick during his time in The Wyatt Family. Strowman started to play mind games on Wyatt, who was laughing hysterically and elated that Strowman presumably decided to rejoin Wyatt and the two embraced. However, Strowman shoved Wyatt back, removed the mask and then performed a Running Powerslam on Wyatt to retain the title. Following the match, as Wyatt sat in the corner realizing he had been outsmarted, imagery of The Fiend appeared on screen.

In the penultimate match, Drew McIntyre defended the WWE Championship against Seth Rollins. Rollins performed a Stomp on McIntyre for a nearfall. In the end, as Rollins attempted another Stomp, McIntyre countered with a Glasgow Kiss. Rebounding off the ropes, Rollins performed a superkick, but as McIntyre also rebounded off the ropes, he performed a Claymore Kick on Rollins to retain the title. Following the match, McIntyre offered a handshake to Rollins, who reluctantly obliged.

Main event
In the main event, both the men's and women's Money in the Bank ladder matches were contested simultaneously at WWE Global Headquarters. The women's match featured Asuka, Shayna Baszler, Nia Jax, Lacey Evans, Carmella, and Dana Brooke, while the men's match featured AJ Styles, Rey Mysterio, Aleister Black, King Corbin, Daniel Bryan, and Otis. The women began in the lobby, where Asuka performed a splash off the mezzanine onto the other competitors before escaping in an elevator. The men, meanwhile, began in the gym, where Otis pinned Styles under a barbell. After leaving the gym, Mysterio ran past a restroom where he encountered Brother Love. 

Bryan, Black, Otis, and Corbin brawled into an elevator, spilling out onto another floor where they briefly encountered Evans, Baszler, and Carmella. Bryan performed Yes Kicks on Corbin with encouragement from Otis, after which, Bryan attacked Otis. A Doink The Clown impersonator then briefly appeared from behind a chair. Baszler, Brooke, Jax, and Carmella then fought into the Money in the Bank Conference Room. After knocking Jax out with a steel chair, Brooke unhooked a prop Money in the Bank briefcase hanging from the ceiling and celebrated, thinking she had won, but Stephanie McMahon appeared and reminded Brooke that the actual briefcase was still on the roof. Carmella then unhooked a large poster off the wall (depicting herself winning the first women's Money in the Bank ladder match) and smashed it over Brooke's head. After Carmella exited the room, Evans performed the Women's Right on Carmella. Searching for Mysterio, Styles encountered a large poster of The Undertaker and then stumbled upon an Undertaker-themed room. This caused him to have flashbacks of his WrestleMania 36 loss to The Undertaker. Black then attacked Styles and closed the door, locking him in the room. 

All of the participants except Styles and Asuka converged on a room where Paul Heyman was indulging in a buffet, and an inter-gender food fight ensued. During the melee, Baszler applied the Kirifuda Clutch on Mysterio, which was broken up when Jax and Otis charged and collided with Mysterio between them. Jax threw Carmella through the buffet table and teased a fight with Otis before the two went separate ways. Otis then encountered John Laurinaitis in the cafeteria and threw a pie in his face. Later, Styles and Bryan brawled into Vince McMahon's office, after which, Mr. McMahon ordered them to leave. Before leaving, however, Styles and Bryan positioned the chairs in their proper place, while Mr. McMahon sanitized his hands. 

Asuka was the first to reach the roof, followed by Jax and Evans. The three fought in and around the rooftop ring until Asuka gained the upper hand by dropping a ladder on Jax. Asuka then briefly fought with Evans on the ladder before throwing her on top of Jax. As Asuka ascended the ladder again, Corbin appeared on the roof and climbed the other side of the ladder; however, Asuka threw him off. Asuka then grabbed the women's briefcase to win the women's match. Otis was the next to reach the roof, followed by Black, Mysterio, Styles, and Bryan. Corbin dispatched Mysterio and Black by throwing them off the roof (on Raw the next night, Mysterio revealed that they were just thrown down to a lower area of the roof). Styles performed the Phenomenal Forearm on Otis and Styles and Corbin climbed the ladder. After a scuffle atop the ladder, Styles and Corbin unhooked the men's briefcase with both holding it. Elias, who Corbin had been feuding with since before WrestleMania, then appeared and attacked Corbin with a guitar, causing both Styles and Corbin to fumble the briefcase into the hands of Otis, who thus won the men's match.

Aftermath

Raw
The following night on Raw, Raw Women's Champion Becky Lynch came out with the women's Money in the Bank briefcase and announced that she would be going on hiatus. A confused Asuka then came out. Lynch stated that by Asuka winning the women's Money in the Bank ladder match, she had actually won the Raw Women's Championship and opened the briefcase, revealing the title belt inside. Lynch then revealed that she was going on hiatus because she was pregnant. With this, Asuka became WWE's second Women's Grand Slam Champion and third Women's Triple Crown Champion.

SmackDown
On the following SmackDown, men's Money in the Bank winner Otis was a guest on MizTV where The Miz and John Morrison made fun of Otis and his relationship with Mandy Rose, and then challenged Otis to a tag team match. Due to the unavailability of Otis' Heavy Machinery tag team partner, Tucker, Otis had to find a different partner. Otis' mystery partner was revealed as Universal Champion Braun Strowman and the two defeated Miz and Morrison in the ensuing tag team match. Afterwards, Rose came out to congratulate Otis and then distracted Strowman for Otis to attempt to cash-in his contract. However, despite the temptation, Otis opted not to and saying he was joking. After entering into a feud with The Miz and John Morrison over the Money in the Bank contract in September, Otis was forced to defend the contract in a match against Miz, who had been drafted to Raw, at October's Hell in a Cell event, where Miz defeated Otis to win the Money in the Bank contract. Miz then successfully cashed in his contract on Raw's WWE Champion Drew McIntyre at Elimination Chamber on February 21, 2021, thus winning his second WWE Championship, last winning it in November 2010, which was also via a Money in the Bank cash-in.

Bray Wyatt made his return on the June 19 episode of SmackDown in a Firefly Fun House segment and stated that his rivalry with Braun Strowman was just getting started before appearing as his old cult leader persona of The Wyatt Family. Wyatt stated that since  he created Strowman, it was his job to destroy him. The following week, Strowman responded by challenging Wyatt to a non-title match at a swamp called the Wyatt Swamp Fight which was scheduled for The Horror Show at Extreme Rules.

Results

Notes

References

External links 
 

2020 WWE Network events
2020 WWE pay-per-view events
2020
2020 in professional wrestling in Florida
Professional wrestling shows in Orlando, Florida
Events in Connecticut
May 2020 events in the United States
Professional wrestling in Connecticut
Impact of the COVID-19 pandemic on television